Yvette Nicole Brown (born August 12, 1971) is an American actress, comedian, writer and host. She starred as Shirley Bennett on the NBC sitcom Community, as Dani in the 2015 version of The Odd Couple on CBS and as Dina Rose on the ABC sitcom The Mayor. Brown has had guest roles in television shows such as Drake & Josh, That '70s Show, The Office, Boston Legal, Chuck, The Soul Man, Mom and Big Shot. In 2021, she received a Primetime Emmy Award nomination for her role in A Black Lady Sketch Show.

In addition to television, she has had supporting roles in films such as (500) Days of Summer, Tropic Thunder, Repo Men, Percy Jackson: Sea of Monsters, and Avengers: Endgame. She voiced Harper in the video game Minecraft: Story Mode in addition to Cookie on Pound Puppies, Luna on Elena of Avalor and Principal Amanda Waller on DC Super Hero Girls. She has hosted Syfy cosplay series Cosplay Melee and has been a frequent couch guest on Talking Dead. She has served as a guest co-host on talk shows including The View, The Talk, and The Real.

Early life
Yvette Nicole Brown was born on August 12, 1971, in East Cleveland, Ohio. She graduated from Warrensville Heights High School in 1989. Brown studied communication studies at the University of Akron and graduated with her Bachelor of Arts in communication in 1994. While at Akron she was selected for initiation into Omicron Delta Kappa, the National Leadership Honors Society. She was initiated into the University of Akron's Delta Pi chapter of Alpha Kappa Alpha sorority on May 2, 1993.

After graduating, Brown took acting classes in Hollywood, Los Angeles.

Career
Brown appeared as "Yvette" in the music video "1-4-All-4-1" by the East Coast Family, a Michael Bivins project, for Biv10 Records. Brown said of the experience, "It was a great run, but I guess music was just never meant to be for me."

Brown first appeared on commercials before entering television shows and films a few years later. She has since played roles on television shows such as The War at Home, Girlfriends, Malcolm in the Middle, That's So Raven, Half & Half, and the American version of The Office. She had a recurring role as movie theater manager Helen Dubois in the Nickelodeon sitcom Drake & Josh. Frances Callier replaced Brown as Helen for one episode. Brown reprised the role in the season 2 episode of Victorious titled "Helen Back Again". She provided the voice of Cookie on The Hub's Pound Puppies.

In 2009, Brown began starring as Shirley Bennett on the comedy series Community. On September 30, 2014, Brown announced that she would be leaving the show after five seasons in order to take care of her ailing father. In her announcement she said, "My dad needs daily care and he needs me. The idea of being away 16 hours a day for five months, I couldn't do it. It was a difficult decision for me to make, but I had to choose my dad."

She has appeared in television commercials for Hamburger Helper, Big Lots, Pine-Sol, Comcast, Aquapod, Shout, Fiber One, Yoplait Yogurt, DiGiorno Pizza, Dairy Queen, and Time Warner. She has appeared on episodes of The Thrilling Adventure Hour as "The Troubleshooter" in the Sparks Nevada, Marshall on Mars series.

In 2012, Brown appeared as a celebrity contestant on GSN's The Pyramid with her Community co-star Danny Pudi.

In 2014, it was reported that Brown was set to recur on the USA Network series Benched. Shortly after her exit of Community, Brown's role of Dani on the CBS sitcom The Odd Couple was upgraded to series regular. She has been a regular guest on AMC's Talking Dead. She hosts Syfy cosplay series Cosplay Melee.

In July 2018, Brown temporarily replaced Chris Hardwick as the host of Talking Dead and served as moderator for The Walking Dead and Fear the Walking Dead panels at the San Diego Comic-Con during Hardwick's suspension.

Brown has had a recurring role as Judge Anita Harper on the HBO series A Black Lady Sketch Show which earned her a nomination for the Primetime Emmy Award for Outstanding Guest Actress in a Comedy Series. In 2019, Brown wrote the independent romantic comedy feature Always a Bridesmaid.

In 2023, Brown voiced KRS, a robotic assistant, and recurring character in My Dad the Bounty Hunter.

Personal life
Brown was inducted into Warrensville Heights High School's hall of fame in 2009. Brown served on the SAG-AFTRA 2019–2021 National Board.

Politics

Brown endorsed and campaigned for Elizabeth Warren in the 2020 Democratic Party presidential primaries. She has been a critic of former U.S. President Donald Trump and then presidential candidate U.S. Senator Bernie Sanders.

During the 2020 general election, Brown, along with several of her Community castmates, made a campaign video in support of Joe Biden, entitled "Human Beings For Biden."

Filmography

Film

Television

Video Games

Podcasts

Awards and nominations

References

External links

 
 

1971 births
Living people
Actresses from Ohio
African-American actresses
African-American female comedians
American film actresses
American television actresses
American voice actresses
American women comedians
Comedians from Ohio
People from East Cleveland, Ohio
University of Akron alumni
20th-century American actresses
21st-century American actresses
20th-century American comedians
21st-century American comedians
20th-century African-American women
20th-century African-American people
21st-century African-American women
21st-century African-American people